Prem Singh Chandumajra (born 1 January 1950) is General Secretary and spokesman of the Shiromani Akali Dal (SAD) and former Member of Parliament from Anandpur Sahib and former constituency MP from Patiala seat. He is also an alumnus of Punjabi University, Patiala. He was a Member of Parliament in 11th, 12th and now of  16th Lok Sabha. He won with a low margin from Himmat Singh Shergill and Ambika Soni, who put up a tough fight.

Education and career 
Chandumajra is a post graduate in Economics and Political Science.  He began his career with a job as economics lecturer in Government College, Derabassi. After a two-year stint, he joined the Punjab School Education Board as subject-expert in economics.

Political career 
Chandumajra started his political career with student activism. During student politics he came into contact with Akali leader Harcharan Singh Longowal, the president of Shiromani Akali Dal, who subsequently appointed him the first president of Youth Akali Dal. Chandumajra became member of Punjab Vidhan Sabha in 1985, representing Dakala, Patiala. During this term, he became the cabinet minister for cooperation in Surjit Singh Barnala government. He was elected to the eleventh Lok Sabha in 1996 by defeating Sant Ram Singla and elected to the twelfth Lok Sabha in 1998 by defeating Capt. Amarinder Singh. Chandumajra contested from Patiala Lok Sabha seat in 2004 on the ticket of Sarb Hind Shiromani Akali Dal, a rebel faction headed by Gurcharan Singh Tohra. Later he became president of Shiromani Akali Dal (Longowal), which was later merged into SAD led by Parkash Singh Badal in year 2007. He has been elected in the Lok Sabha elections 2014 from Anandpur Sahib on SAD ticket.

Electoral performance

References

External links 
 
Akali dal organisation structure
Affidavits filed during Assembly Election 2007

1950 births
Living people
Punjabi people
People from Patiala district
Indian Sikhs
Shiromani Akali Dal politicians
India MPs 1996–1997
India MPs 1998–1999
Lok Sabha members from Punjab, India
India MPs 2014–2019
Politicians from Amritsar district